Jake Goodman may refer to:
 Jake Goodman (baseball) (1853–1890), Major League Baseball player
 Jake Goodman (footballer) (born 1993), English footballer